The History of United States Naval Operations in World War II is a 15-volume account of the United States Navy in World War II, written by Samuel Eliot Morison and published by Little, Brown and Company between 1947 and 1962.

Background
Immediately after the attack on Pearl Harbor, Morison, already convinced of the value of personal involvement as a result of sailing experience while writing his biography of Christopher Columbus, wrote to President Roosevelt suggesting the preparation of an official history of the Navy in the war, and volunteering for the task. Both President Roosevelt and the Secretary of the Navy Frank Knox agreed, and in May 1942 Morison was commissioned as a Lieutenant Commander in the United States Naval Reserve, and assigned a staff of assistants, with permission to go anywhere and to see all official records. Morison's reputation as a knowledgeable sailor (based on his analysis in the biography of Christopher Columbus) preceded him, and he was welcomed on a number of ships, eleven of them in all by the end of the war.

The result was a normal historical work, not a prescribed official history. Limitations of the History of U.S. Naval Operations are mostly due to its shortened period of publication. Some material, especially related to codebreaking, was still classified, and later in-depth research into particular occurrences in the war did clarify points that had been passed over rather lightly. Some rewriting was incorporated in the later printings of this series. This History of U.S. Naval Operations also intentionally avoided a certain amount of analysis, for instance deferring to other works for the causes of the Japanese Attack on Pearl Harbor. The intended audience for the work, to quote from the preface, was "the general reader rather than the professional sailor."

Contents
The volumes:
 
 
 
 
 
 
 
 
 
 
 
 
 
 
 

An abridgement of the fifteen-volume work was written by Morison and published in 1963:

Documentary
This History of U.S. Naval Operations also played an indirect role in the history of television. One of Morison's research assistants in the project, Henry Salomon, knew NBC's Robert Sarnoff and, in 1949, first proposed an ambitious documentary TV series on U.S. Navy and Marine Corps warfare in World War II. In 1951 the National Broadcasting Company hired Salomon to produce what would become the 1952–1953 TV series, Victory at Sea. The success of this TV series played a major role in establishing the historic documentary—using combat footage—as a viable television genre.

References

1947 non-fiction books
20th-century history books
United States Navy in World War II
Books of naval history
Series of history books about World War II
Books about the United States Navy
Book series introduced in 1947